A Taxi Driver is a 2017 South Korean historical action drama film directed by Jang Hoon and written by Eom Yu-na, with Song Kang-ho starring in the title role, alongside Thomas Kretschmann, Yoo Hae-jin, and Ryu Jun-yeol.

Based on a real-life story, the film centers on a taxi driver from Seoul who unintentionally becomes involved in the events of the Gwangju Uprising in 1980. It is based on German journalist Jürgen Hinzpeter's interactions with driver Kim Sa-bok; however, as Kim's identity and real name were unknown at the time the film was made (Hinzpeter only knew him as "Kim Sa-bok"), most elements regarding his life and the events that happened to him outside of Gwangju are fictional.

The film was released on August 2, 2017, in South Korea. It was very positively received by critics, who praised its unique approach to depicting the Gwangju Uprising events, emotional weight, as well as the main character and his relationship with Hinzpeter, and was selected as the South Korean entry for the Best Foreign Language Film at the 90th Academy Awards. The film was a notable commercial success: it was the second highest grossing film of 2017 in South Korea, and currently stands as the twelfth highest-grossing South Korean film in history.

Background

Historical Background 
The film centers around the Gwangju Uprising that occurred from May 18, 1980 to May 27, 1980 and it is estimated to have led to 2,000 people being killed. The plot in the film mirrors the historical background of the Gwangju Uprisings.

The Gwangju Uprising was a result of a continuous power tug-of-war between the government and the citizens of South Korea – mainly college students – that were advocating for democracy.

For many years, Gwangju’s Uprising was a forbidden term in South Korea – those who were on the side of the government during that time held the reins of nation. According to scholar Jang Se Young from the Wilson Center, "books related to Gwangju were strictly censored or prohibited from even being published. Although a number of political dissidents and activists sought to inherit and develop the spirit of Gwangju, they were persecuted." Scholar Kim Yong Cheol stated, "the political legacies the Gwangju Uprising produced played a pivotal role in checking military intervention in politics during the democratic transition as well as in establishing the principle of civilian supremacy during the democratic transition period." Despite being banned, hundreds and thousands of news articles on what was happening in Gwangju were trying to be released by some of the journalists inside the city.

Efforts were made by some American journalists in order to inform the world about what was happening in Gwangju. Tim Shorrock published numerous US government documents related to the uprisings that were happening in Gwangju, and Terry Anderson, who was a former AP correspondent, covered the uprisings himself and provided an eyewitness account of the situation in 1980.  People in Seoul were not aware of what was happening in Gwangju, until international media took hold of the story. Andrew David Jackson of Cambridge University argued that Jürgen Hinzpeter's relationship with South Korea's democratization movement "have become important weapons for the activist generation in an ongoing struggle over the memorialization of the Gwangju Uprising."

Candlelight Protests 
Candlelight protests through the fall and winter of 2016-17 marked the thirtieth year of significant democratic advancement in South Korean history, compared to the setting in which A Taxi Driver took place. Harvard sociology professor Paul Y. Chang argued in 2018 in KOAJ that "the contemporary candlelight protest industry draws on organizational and cultural resources first established in past democracy movements." During the filming of the movie, the director Jang Hoon was stopped multiple times, and the main actor of this film, Song Kang Ho, was blacklisted by the government from appearing on major motion picture films. Similar to the past, where newspaper articles and mass media coverage in South Korea was heavily monitored and censored, this movie faced obstacles as it reached its release date due to the former government’s implications.

Plot

In 1980, Kim Man-seob is a debt-laden, widowed father who works as a taxi driver in Seoul. One day, he overhears another taxi driver talking about a foreign client who has booked him for a trip worth 100,000 won (the Korean equivalent of 100 dollars); the client intends to travel to Gwangju for the day and return to Seoul before curfew. Man-seob rushes off to steal the client.

The client is Jürgen "Peter" Hinzpeter, a West German journalist who wishes to report on the increasing civil unrest in Gwangju. Due to strict censorship, foreign reporters are prohibited from entering the country. Peter pretends to be a missionary in order to enter South Korea. Man-seob meets Peter and lures him into his taxi before heading off to Gwangju.

The two men discover that all the roads leading to Gwangju are blocked and heavily guarded by soldiers. Man-seob tries to convince Peter that they should return to Seoul, but the latter refuses to pay the 100,000 won unless they reach Gwangju. They manage to enter the city after they lie about Peter being a businessman. In Gwangju, they find that all the shops are closed and the streets are deserted. Man-Seob dismisses the severity of the city's state as he believes that the recent riots were caused by students who only "go to school to protest" in part due to the news reporting misinformation. Peter begins to record his observations on his camera, and the two men meet a group of college students who are riding on a pickup truck. The leader of the group, Yong-pyo, invites Peter aboard. They also befriend an English-speaking student, Jae-sik. Man-seob decides to turn back, reluctant to have his taxi damaged in the riots. Along the way, he takes pity on an old woman looking for her son and she leads him to the local hospital. The woman's son turns out to be Yong-pyo, who is in the hospital with minor injuries. Peter and the college students scold Man-seob for his selfishness and refuse to let Peter pay him until he fulfills the agreed upon trip.

Man-seob agrees to take Peter and Jae-sik (now acting as their translator) through Gwangju. Local protesters welcome the foreign reporter and greet the trio with food and gifts. Peter films violent riots and witnesses soldiers beating protesters. Plainclothed Defense Security Command (DSC) officers (presumed to be the DSC 505th Defense Security Unit) see him filming and move to arrest him, but the three men evade capture. That evening, Man-seob's taxi breaks down and they are met by Tae-soo, one of the local taxi drivers. Tae-soo tows the taxi to his shop for overnight repair. Man-seob becomes distressed as his young daughter is home alone and he is unable to contact her as Gwangju's phone lines have been cut. Tae-soo lets the men stay at his house for the night.

During dinner, they hear an explosion and discover that the television station has been bombed. They head there and Peter films the turmoil. The officers recognize Peter and chase the three men; Jae-sik is captured, but before he is taken away, he yells for Peter to share the footage with the world. Man-seob is assaulted by the leader of the plainclothes DSC officers, who accuses the driver of being a communist. Peter rescues Man-seob and the pair run back to Tae-soo's house.

At dawn, Tae-soo gives Man-seob fake Gwangju license plates as he's learned the soldiers are now searching for a Seoul taxi. Alone, Man-seob drives to the nearby town of Suncheon, where he overhears reports of the events in Gwangju; the media falsely claims that the chaos was caused by "rogue groups and rioters". He is overwhelmed with guilt and drives back to the hospital in Gwangju to find Peter in shock and Tae-soo crying over Jae-sik's corpse. He reminds Peter of his promise to show the world what is happening in South Korea and encourages him to continue filming. Peter urges Man-seob to return to Seoul and his daughter but Man-soeb insists on remaining with his customer, so they take off in the direction of new street fighting.

They film a street where Airborne Brigade soldiers are mercilessly shooting at civilians, mostly young students, including those rescuing the wounded. Desperate to help, Man-seob and the other taxi drivers use their vehicles to barricade the soldiers from further harming the civilians. As Airborne Brigade soldiers continue shooting, they help as many of the wounded as they can into the taxis and get them to safety. Then Man-soeb and Peter head for Seoul, urged by everyone to get Peter's footage out to the world above all. Meanwhile, the commander has ordered all roads blocked to search for the Seoul taxi with a foreign reporter. On circuitous back roads, the two men arrive at a road blocked by 31st Infantry Division soldiers. Man-seob states that he is taking a foreign businessman away from the turmoil. A young soldier, Sergeant First Class Park, searches the car and sees the license plates from Seoul buried in the trunk. However, he remains silent about the discovery and lets them go. The soldiers then receive orders through radio not to let any foreigners through just as Man-seob starts up and breaks through the barricade by force. The soldiers open fire, but Sergeant Park just watches without firing.

However, DSC officers soon give chase and shoot at them and nearly succeed in trapping them when Man-seob and Peter are rescued by the arrival of the local taxi drivers, who weave in to blockade Man-seob's taxi and eventually, under chase, to ram into the military vehicles to derail the soldiers. The taxi drivers are presumably killed in the chase, and Tae-soo ultimately sacrifices himself with his taxi as the final blockade to allow Man-seob and Peter to escape. The two men make it to the airport, where they bid each other an emotional farewell. Peter asks Man-seob for his name and phone number as he wishes to return to South Korea to visit. Man-seob hesitates, but then writes a cigarette company name instead of his name and a phone number in Peter's notebook. Peter leaves the country safely. In Seoul, Man-seob happily and tearfully reunites with his daughter.

Next we see Peter amid his journalist colleagues watching as his footage is broadcast and spreads all over the world. On subsequent return trips to Seoul, he searches for "Kim Sa-bok", only to be told that the latter had provided a false name and phone number. 

Twenty-three years later, Peter receives an award in South Korea for his report on the Gwangju Uprising. In his speech, he expresses his gratitude to "Kim Sa-bok" and hopes to see him again someday. Man-seob, still a taxi driver, reads a newspaper article about Peter's speech and achievements, including his words of gratitude towards him. Man-seob then murmurs that he is more grateful to Peter and that he misses him too.

The epilogue states that Peter tried to search for the taxi driver who took him through Gwangju, but he died in 2016 before they could meet again. The film ends with footage of the real Peter, recording his thanks to "Kim Sa-bok".

Cast

Main
 Song Kang-ho as Kim Man-seob
A widowed taxi driver who lives with his eleven year old daughter in a small house. He is an ordinary man from the working class who cares only about his family's livelihood and is uninterested in political issues. The character is loosely based on real-life taxi driver Kim Sa-bok, who ferried Jürgen Hinzpeter to Gwangju. Kim's whereabouts was unknown until the release of A Taxi Driver, when in September 2017, following the immense commercial and critical success of the film in South Korea, Kim's identity was finally confirmed by his son, Kim Seung-pil. The younger Kim shared with the media a photo of Jürgen Hinzpeter with his father and revealed that his father died of cancer in 1984, four years after the Gwangju events. Kim Sa-bok was reportedly 54 years old at the time of his death in December 1984.
 Thomas Kretschmann as Jürgen Hinzpeter
A German reporter. The character is based on the life of Jürgen Hinzpeter (1937–2016), the late German journalist who filmed and reported on the Gwangju massacre.
 Yoo Hae-jin as Hwang Tae-sool
A kindhearted local taxi driver.
 Ryu Jun-yeol as Gu Jae-sik
A naive university student who knows English.

Supporting

 Park Hyuk-kwon as Reporter Choi
 Choi Gwi-hwa as Leader of Plainclothes DSC Officer 
 Uhm Tae-goo as Sergeant first class Park of ROK Army 31st Infantry Division 
 Yoo Eun-mi as Eun-jeong 
Kim Man-seob's daughter.
 Cha Soon-bae as Driver Cha
 Shin Dam-soo as Driver Shin
 Ryoo Seong-hyeon as Driver Ryoo
 Park Min-hee as Kwon Joong-ryeong
 Lee Jung-eun as Hwang Tae-sool's wife
 Kwon Soon-joon as Kang Sang-goo 
 Yoon Seok-ho as Hwang Tae-sool's son 
 Heo Jeong-do as Seoul pregnant wife's husband
 Lee Bong-ryun as Seoul pregnant wife 
 Lee Ho-cheol as Hong Yong-pyo
 Lee Young-yi as Hong Yong-pyo's wife
 Han Geun-sup as University student protester
 Hong Wan-pyo as University student protester

Special appearances
 Ko Chang-seok as Sang-goo's father
 Jeon Hye-jin as Sang-goo's mother
 Jung Jin-young as Reporter Lee
 Ryu Tae-ho as Gwangju newspaper director
 Jeong Seok-yong as President of car center in Seoul

Production
Filming began on June 5, 2016, and ended on October 24, 2016.

Release
The film was released on August 2, 2017 in South Korea. On the same day, the film had its international premiere at the Fantasia International Film Festival in Montreal, where Song Kang-ho was named Best Actor for his role in the film.

According to distributor Showbox, the film will be released in North America on August 11, Australia and New Zealand on August 24, followed by the UK on August 25. It will then open in Asian countries including Hong Kong, Taiwan and Japan in September.

Reception

Positive reviews

A Taxi Driver received positive reviews upon its release. The review aggregation website Rotten Tomatoes gives the film an approval rating of 96% based on 28 reviews, with an average rating of 7.3/10. The website's critical consensus reads "A Taxi Driver brings a ground-level perspective and a refreshingly light touch to a fact-based story with sobering implications." On Metacritic, which assigns a normalized rating based on reviews, the film has a score of 69 out of 100, based on 7 critics, indicating "generally favorable reviews".

Sohing Yi Chan of OFF SCREEN pointed out A Taxi Driver “as a film depicting a historical trauma”, let the international audience, especially those who were not familiar with the event, be able to learn more about the truth.  He also suggested that the film by adopting a classical Hollywood structure in narrative, gave audiences a chance to “experience the roller coaster of emotions that the film bombards the audience within a highly workmanlike fashion”.  
   
Jennie Kermode of Eye For Film shared the relevant ideas that the director didn’t ignore the peaceful and lovely moments besides the violent, panic and horrible scenes, and it created a contrast in emotion and let audience keep shocking or plunge into consideration.

The cinematography in this film gained some more attention. Sheri Linden of The Hollywood Reporter went further that especially in the checkpoint scene and the mountain-road chase scene, the cinematography captured a “metal-on-metal violence” which was exaggerated in a “pastoral backdrop” that made Kim’s decision and reaction more convincing. Sheri Linden also refuted the doubt on the other character Hinzpeter that his emotions might be overplayed in the last act, by evidencing the found footage from the real Hinzpeter by the end of the film, to show the proper performance in the film.

Edeltraut Brahmstaedt, the widow of the German journalist Jürgen Hinzpeter, was to visit Seoul on August 8, 2017. During the visit, Brahmstaedt planned to watch the film based on the true story of her late husband.

On August 13, 2017, South Korea's President Moon Jae-in viewed A Taxi Driver with Edeltraut Brahmstaedt and her family. A Blue House official said, "The movie shows how a foreign reporter's efforts contributed to Korea's democratization, and President Moon saw the film to honor Hinzpeter in respect for what he did for the country." After watching the film, President Moon commented:

Critical reviews
Some people have pointed out the formulaic elements and the weakness they brought to the film. Manfred Selzer of Asian Movie Web argued due to the heavy use of slow-motion, repetitions and soundtrack, some scenes of killing seemed too melodramatic; and the exciting scenes that the taxi chasing on mountain road although were some wonderful action scenes, did not work on well with the narrative, which seemed “out of place in the film and aren’t captured that convincing either”.

Simon Abrams of RogerEbert.com argued that Peter was depicted as a stiff supporting role to work for the narrative rather than a vivid character in the story, and each peak moment “feels too neat and schematic” that couldn’t evoke sincere emotion.

Sohing Yin Chan, in his review, questioned whether the emotional wave based on the balanced narrative made between drama and action genre could squeeze the audience’s tear in ethical way; he also believed those emotion are “too detached from all the action."

Box office 
According to the Korean Film Council, on the first day of the release, a total of 698,090 tickets were sold, which earned . The film was available on 1,446 screens and was shown 7,068 times across South Korea. By noon on the second day of its run, the film had passed the one million viewer mark.

On the third day, the total audience doubled, attracting two million viewers. The viewer numbers continued to rise as the tickets sale increased to four million by the fourth day.

It has tied with The Admiral: Roaring Currents and The Battleship Island for the record of films which have surpassed four million viewers in the first five days of release. At the end of the first seven days, the film surpassed 5 million admissions. On the eleventh day since the opening the film recorded more than 7 million viewers.

A Taxi Driver became the most viewed South Korean film in 2017 in less than two weeks since its premiere by attracting more than 8 million audience.

A Taxi Driver also became the first film of 2017 and the fifteenth Korean film overall to surpass the 10 million milestone. It is also Song Kang-ho's third film to have sold more than 10 million tickets.

The film topped the South Korean box office for three consecutive weekends. By August 28, the film had attracted 11.4 million viewers. According to the film's distributor Showbox, the total attendance of the film surpassed the 12 million mark as of September 9, becoming the tenth most-watched local film of all time in South Korea.

Reactions in China 

A Taxi Driver is yet to be released in any form in China, though it received a theatrical release on September 21, 2017 in Hong Kong. The film has received warm responses from users on Chinese movie website Douban, where it had a high user rating. However at around 21:10, October 3, 2017, the film was entirely removed from the Chinese movie portal, the reason possibly being that a number of reviews had compared the film's content to the 1989 Tiananmen Square protests and massacre, which is strictly censored on media in China.

Fictionalized elements
A Taxi Driver generally shows good accuracy on the memory of Gwangju Uprising, but several historical events depicted in the film are inaccurate and fictional.

The name of the taxi driver who helps Hinzpeter in the film is Kim Man-seob. He gives a false name, Kim Sa-bok, to Hinzpeter when he asks for Kim's name later in the film. However, in real life, the taxi driver’s name was actually Kim Sa-bok. The only information known about the driver at the time during production was the name Kim Sa-bok, which was not registered as a taxi driver (due to his being a hotel taxi driver, not a self-employed taxi driver). Therefore, most of the character settings, including the "real" name Kim Man-seob, were created for the film.

In the film, Kim Man-seob is a self-employed taxi driver. Kim Sa-bok (real name of Kim Man-seob) actually wasn't a self-employed taxi driver, but a hotel taxi driver. Thus, his car was not a green taxi shown in the film but a black sedan.

In the film, only Kim Man-seob and Jürgen Hinzpeter head to Gwangju. However, in real life they were accompanied by Hinzpeter’s sound technician Henning Rumohr.

The massive car chase sequence in which the taxi drivers in Gwangju help Kim Man-seob and Hinzpeter escape Gwangju did not happen. In reality, they escaped from Gwangju without incident on the pretext of doing business.

In the film, Kim Man-seob communicates with Hintzpeter in short English and is unable to speak English fluently. However, Kim sa-bok in real life was able to speak fluent English.

Kim Man-seob in the film shows no interest in demonstrations and doesn't know what's happening in Gwangju. In real life, Kim Sa-bok was actually interested in democratic movements and explained the situation in Gwangju to Hinzpeter.

In the film, Jürgen Hinzpeter is described as the only foreign press personnel to document the events in Gwangju. However, other foreign news reporters including Henry Scott Stokes from The New York Times and Terry Anderson from Associated Press were in Gwangju covering the movement.

The movie ends with footage of an interview from November 2015 with the real Jürgen Hinzpeter describing his fruitless efforts to find his driver Kim Sa-bok again, after the events of Gwangju.   Hinzpeter died in January, 2016 without ever finding Kim Sa-bok.    In 2017, the immense popularity in South Korea of the movie "A Taxi Driver" brought the story of Kim Sa-bok to the attention of his son, Kim Seung-pil, who came forth publicly on Twitter and presented photographic evidence and details of his father's work with Jürgen Hinzpeter.   The real Kim Sa-bok had a long term working relationship as a driver for Jürgen Hinzpeter, since at least 1975, and had died of liver cancer on December 19, 1984 at the age of 54.    According to his son, Kim Sa-bok was traumatized by the terrible events at Gwangju and became a heavy drinker afterwards, which likely hastened his death.    Kim Sa-bok's death just a few years after the events depicted in the movie, and the fact that he was an independent driver not registered with any of the taxi companies were the reasons that Jürgen Hinzpeter had been unable to find him again when he returned later to Korea.  The photographs presented by Kim Seung-pil were confirmed to be authentic by German broadcaster ARD and Hinzpeter's widow.

Awards and nominations

See also
 List of submissions to the 90th Academy Awards for Best Foreign Language Film
 List of South Korean submissions for the Academy Award for Best International Feature Film

Notes

References

External links
 
 
 
 A Taxi Driver at Naver Movies 

2017 films
2010s action comedy-drama films
2010s historical comedy-drama films
2010s Korean-language films
South Korean action comedy-drama films
South Korean historical comedy-drama films
South Korean political films
South Korean road movies
Films directed by Jang Hoon
English-language South Korean films
Films about the Gwangju Uprising
Films about taxis
Films about journalists
Political action films
Films set in 1980
Films set in Gwangju
Drama films based on actual events
Showbox films
South Korean films based on actual events
2010s South Korean films